AC Crusaders is a professional American soccer team based in Egg Harbor Township, New Jersey, United States. Founded in 2010, the team made its debut in the Northeast Keystone Division of the National Premier Soccer League, the fourth tier of the American Soccer Pyramid in 2011. The Crusaders return to compete in the American Soccer League (ASL) in August 2014.

The team plays its home games in the stadium at Egg Harbor Township High School.

History
AC Crusaders played two seasons in the NPSL, finishing in fourth place of the Keystone Division each year. Their inaugural season of 2011 ended with a record of 6–3–3. The club finished 4–0–6 in the 2012 NPSL season before going on hiatus.

Current roster
As of March 1, 2015

Year-by-year

Coaches
Kyle Hall was named head coach of the AC Crusaders on December 5, 2014, after taking over as interim head coach on September 19, 2014. Hall quickly made his mark on the first team as interim manager, leading the Crusaders to a win against Mass United. Hall finished the Fall season with one win, one tie and two losses.
A native of Bolton, England. Hall joined the AC Crusaders' sister company Atlantic Soccer Factory staff at the academy ranks in June 2012, where he serves as their Technical director. Additionally, Hall was the U23 assistant coach where he served his time under head coach Matt Driver and was instrumental in helping the U-23's capturing the 2013 league title.

Jason Smith was named assistant coach of the AC Crusaders on February 27, 2015. The Scotland native recently joined the Crusader sister company Atlantic Soccer Factory in 2013 where he holds the role of Regional Director.

He has experience working in the Scottish Championship with Raith Rovers & Cowdenbeath Football Club where Jason coached the U17's, U19's and reserve team squads. Smith also spent a year working with Perth Glory in Australia coaching their youth program. He holds his UEFA C Licence and is currently working towards his UEFA B Licence.

Stadium
 Egg Harbor Township High School; Egg Harbor Township, New Jersey (2011–present)

References

External links
 Official site

Association football clubs established in 2010
National Premier Soccer League teams
2010 establishments in New Jersey
Egg Harbor Township, New Jersey
Sports in Atlantic County, New Jersey
American Soccer League (2014–2017) teams